Zakharyata is a rural locality (a village) in Vereshchaginsky District, Perm Krai, Russia. The population was 169 as of 2010. There are 3 streets.

Geography 
Zakharyata is located 22 km north of Vereshchagino (the district's administrative centre) by road. Durovo is the nearest rural locality.

References 

Rural localities in Vereshchaginsky District